"Kiss a Girl" is a song recorded by Australian country music singer Keith Urban. It was released in March 2009 as the second single from his 2009 album Defying Gravity. The song reached number three on the US Billboard Hot Country Songs chart. The song also became his highest peak on the Billboard Hot 100 at number 16, and his only top 20 on that chart to date. Urban co-wrote this song with Monty Powell.

Along with eventual Idol winner Kris Allen, Urban performed the song live during the finale of the eighth season of American Idol on 20 May 2009.

Content
"Kiss a Girl" is a moderate up-tempo song in which the male narrator expresses a desire to fall in love with a female.

Critical reception
Thom Jurek of AllMusic cited "Kiss a Girl" as a standout track on the album, calling it a "tight little rocker". He said that it and "Sweet Thing", the album's first single, "are 21st century equivalents of rock & roll love songs." Jonathan Keefe of Slant Magazine described the song unfavorably, saying that it was a retread of his previous single "Sweet Thing", which itself was described as a retread of Urban's earlier material.

Music videos
Both a finalised and a promotional music video for "Kiss a Girl" are available for view on CMT and were both directed by Chris Hicky.

Promotional video
The promotional video for the song premiered in April 2009 on CMT's website. It consists of Urban and his band performing in front of a green screen. Some of these scenes were later edited and included the TV video.

Official video
The official video was found on iTunes on 25 May 2009. It consists of Urban and the band performing in an animated city. Also included is two people who eventually find each other and fall in love. At the end, the ferris wheel they ride displays "KISS" on each car, a reference to the song's title.

Track listing

Chart performance

Weekly charts

Year-end charts

Certifications and sales

Release history

References

Songs about kissing
2009 singles
Keith Urban songs
Song recordings produced by Dann Huff
Songs written by Monty Powell
Songs written by Keith Urban
Capitol Records Nashville singles
Music videos directed by Chris Hicky
2009 songs